Brandon Louis Bochenski (born April 4, 1982) is an American former professional ice hockey player and politician. He played 156 games in the National Hockey League (NHL) for several teams before serving as captain of Barys Astana in the Kontinental Hockey League (KHL). Internationally Bochenski represented both the United States and Kazakhstan, playing in several World Championships. In June 2020, Bochenski was elected mayor of Grand Forks, North Dakota.

Playing career

Early years
Bochenski went to Blaine High School where he graduated in 2000. Bochenski was a part of the Blaine Bengals when they defeated the Duluth East Greyhounds 6–0 in the 2000 class AA championship. Also in the Minnesota State High School League tournament, Bochenski and the Bengals defeated Rochester Mayo, Hastings and finished the tournament leading the AA in scoring with 7 points. The St. Paul Pioneer Press named Bochenski along with teammates Matt Hendricks and Matt Moore to the second team of the All-State Boys hockey team.

Amateur
With the Lincoln Stars of the USHL in 2000–01, Bochenski led the league in goals with 47 and was the single highest goal total in the league over the past 15 years. Playing in 55 games that year, Bochenski had 80 points and was named the USHL's Rookie of the Year. His standout performances were noticed by the Ottawa Senators and he was subsequently drafted in the seventh round, 223rd overall, in the 2001 NHL Entry Draft. Bochenski would then leave the USHL to pursue a collegiate career.

Bochenski was heavily recruited to play college hockey in the NCAA, finally choosing the University of North Dakota. Bochenski went on to spend three seasons with UND in the WCHA. As a freshman at UND, Bochenski led his team with five game-winning goals and was third in total points. While North Dakota failed to make the NCAA tournament in 2001–02, Bochenski would not fail again leading UND to two NCAA tournaments in his final two years at UND. In each of his final two years at UND, Bochenski led his team in goals, points and power play goals. After the 2003–04 season, Bochenski would sign with the Ottawa Senators where he would make his professional hockey debut with the Binghamton Senators of the AHL.

Professional

During his first season in the AHL with the Binghamton Senators, Bochenski racked up 34 goals and 36 assists for 70 points in just 75 games. The following year, he only saw action in 33 games, but scored 22 goals and had 24 assists. It would be the 2005–06 season when Bochenski would make his NHL debut with the Ottawa Senators.

After being called up from the Senators, Bochenski would debut on October 5, 2005, and go on to play in twenty games. His first NHL point was an assist versus the Buffalo Sabres on October 8, 2005. Just one week later on October 15, 2005, Bochenski would have his first career goal scoring against the Boston Bruins. In a game against the Florida Panthers on December 15, 2005, Bochenski scored his first career hat trick. Bochenski would then be traded to the Chicago Blackhawks, leaving the Ottawa Senators scoring six goals and assisting on seven others.

On March 9, 2006, he was traded to the Chicago Blackhawks along with a second round pick in exchange for Tyler Arnason. Bochenski would record his first point for the Blackhawks on March 19, 2006, and his first goal on April 1, 2006. Bochenski would go on to play for the Blackhawks in twenty games before helping the Norfolk Admirals in which he tallied two points in three playoff games. In his twenty appearances in 2005–06, Bochenski would record four points.

In 2006–07, Bochenski spent the majority of the year with the Admirals. With Norfolk, Bochenski had a phenomenal year scoring at a torrid pace, 33 goals with 33 assists in just 35 games. After an early January 2007 injury to Martin Havlát, Bochenski was recalled and found more playing time. But on February 3, 2007, the Blackhawks traded him to the Boston Bruins for Kris Versteeg and a conditional pick. On February 6, 2007, soon after joining to the Bruins, Bochenski scored his first Bruin goal at the five-minute mark of the second period. The game ended in a 3–2 victory after a shootout against the Washington Capitals.

On June 18, 2007, Bochenski signed a one-year deal with the Boston Bruins for the 2007–08 season. However seldom used as a reserve forward after 20 games with the Bruins on January 2, 2008, the Bruins traded Bochenski to the Anaheim Ducks for Shane Hnidy and a 6th round pick in the 2008 NHL Entry Draft. He played in 12 games with the Ducks with 4 points before he was traded to his third team within the season, the Nashville Predators, for future considerations on February 26, 2008.

On July 8, 2008, Bochenski joined his sixth NHL team when he signed as a free agent to a two-year contract with the Tampa Bay Lightning. Prior to the 2008–09 season on September 25, 2008, the Lightning placed Bochenski on waivers for the purpose of sending him to American Hockey League affiliate team, the Norfolk Admirals. Returning to Norfolk for a second stint, who were formerly affiliates with the Blackhawks, Bochenski was among scoring leaders of the Admirals and often the Lightnings first recall in cases of injury. After two seasons within the Lightning organization, Brandon became the Admirals record goal scoring leader, passing Casey Hankinson 76 goals to finish with 81 as well as hold the record for most game-winning goals (15) and power play goals (34).

On May 5, 2010, Bochenski left North America and signed a one-year contract with Kazakh Kontinental Hockey League team, Barys Astana.

Bochenski was amongst the league's top scorers over the following seven seasons with Barys Astana. On May 29, 2017, despite pleas from Astana to continue with the club, Bochenski opted to retire from professional hockey to concentrate on his family. He left as the top scoring foreign player to compete in the KHL with 397 points in 399 total games.

On July 9, 2018, Bochenski announced his comeback when he signed a one-year deal to return to Barys Astana. In the 2018–19 season, Bochenski continued to produce with Barys, contributing with 15 goals and 34 points in 44 games.

Post-playing career
At the conclusion of his one-year contract, Bochenski announced his retirement for the second and final time, accepting a position within Berkshire Hathaway Home Services in Grand Forks, North Dakota on July 15, 2019.

He turned to politics, and on June 9, 2020, was elected the mayor of Grand Forks, North Dakota, defeating the 20 year incumbent by nearly 18%.

International play
On March 24, 2016, the IIHF announced it had approved a request to allow Bochenski, Nigel Dawes and Dustin Boyd to play for Kazakhstan at the 2016 IIHF World Championship.

His last international tournament was the 2019 Division IA World Championship. Captaining Kazakhstan he helped the team win the tournament and earn promotion to the top level for the 2020 World Championship.

Career statistics

Regular season and playoffs

International

Awards and honors

References

External links
 

1982 births
Living people
American men's ice hockey right wingers
Anaheim Ducks players
Barys Astana captains
Barys Nur-Sultan players
Binghamton Senators players
Boston Bruins players
Chicago Blackhawks players
Ice hockey players from Minnesota
Kazakhstani ice hockey players
Lincoln Stars players
Nashville Predators players
Norfolk Admirals players
North Dakota Fighting Hawks men's ice hockey players
Ottawa Senators draft picks
Ottawa Senators players
People from Blaine, Minnesota
Providence Bruins players
Tampa Bay Lightning players
AHCA Division I men's ice hockey All-Americans